Poruba pod Vihorlatom is a village and municipality in Michalovce District in the Košice Region of eastern Slovakia.

History
In historical records the village was first mentioned in 1418.

Geography
The village lies at an altitude of 193 metres and covers an area of 20.503 km².
It has a population of about 610 people.

The village lies at the southern foothills of the Vihorlat Mountains.

Ethnicity
The population is about 99% Slovak in ethnicity.

Culture
The village has a small public library, a football pitch.

Transport
The nearest railway station is 24 kilometres away at Michalovce.

Gallery

External links

 http://www.statistics.sk/mosmis/eng/run.html
 http://www.poruba.eu/ Vitajte na oficiálnych internetových stránkach obce Poruba pod Vihorlatom.
 Poruba pod Vihorlatom - ShtetLink

Villages and municipalities in Michalovce District